James Gaffield Sumner (August 16, 1851 – April 21, 1881), was an American professional umpire in Major League Baseball. He officiated 28 games as a National League umpire from 1876 until 1878.

References

1851 births
1881 deaths
Major League Baseball umpires
Sportspeople from Boston
19th-century baseball umpires